Donnie G: Don Gorilla is the fifth studio album by American rapper Sheek Louch. The album was released on December 14, 2010, by D-Block Records and Def Jam Recordings. The album features guest appearances from Jadakiss, Styles P, Bun B, Fabolous, and Bully, among others.

Singles
The first single from the album is "Party After 2", which features R&B singer Jeremih. A video was released for the single on December 21, 2010.

Track listing

Charts

References

2010 albums
Def Jam Recordings albums
Sheek Louch albums
D-Block Records albums
Albums produced by Bangladesh (record producer)
Albums produced by Statik Selektah
Albums produced by Don Cannon